Mein Na Janoo is a 2019 Pakistani television series co-produced by Momina Duraid and Adnan Siddiqui under their home banners of MD Productions and Cereal Entertainment. It features Sanam Jung, Zahid Ahmed, Affan Waheed and Komal Aziz Khan.

Plot
The story revolves around a girl named Saira who along with her mother faces a lot of abuse from her cantankerous paternal grandmother and her step-mother. Though, her half-sister Kiran is very kind with both of them. Saira's father had married another woman and now he has two wives, having one daughter with each: Saira, who is his first wife's daughter and Kiran, who is his second wife's daughter. Saira's father also has two younger sisters and each of them have a son. His first sister Sabra has a son named Nain, a former Pakistan Air Force member, who is now blind. His youngest sister Asma has a son named Nehat, who developed feelings for Saira when they were younger. But Saira only treated Nehat as a brother and had no feelings for him. On the other hand, Kiran developed feelings for Nehat, but Nehat does not feel the same way. Even though Saira treats Nain also as a brother, she have mild feelings for him but Nain does loves Saira. On the mehndi night of Kiran and Nehat, Nehat snatches the gun from the guard and runs off with Saira. Apart from Nain, they all blame Farah for this. Once Saira had been found and returned safely, Nain beats Nihat to the point he is hospitalized. Tehmina and ama ji were about to visit Nehat in hospital but Waleed stops them from doing so, saying that he should be in a worst condition than this. Waleed decides to end the relationship with Asma and Tehmina blames Saira for this. After all this Waleed decided to marry Saira off with Nain to save her honor. When Nehat finds out about this, it makes him go mad. He starts stalking Saira and cause disputes to arise in Saira and Nain's relationship.  Waleed, Asma and Sabra's younger brother Asghar had been missing for 15 years and they had all blamed Farah since then. It had been revealed that he was in coma for 15 years in hospital. He had been found and returned home safely. Asghar helps Farah clean her name and let her regain her honor. Nehat marries Kiran but is actually still obsessed with Saira. One night when Nehat goes into Saira's house, Nain discovers him and tries to kill him but Saira stops him from doing so which makes Nain think that she had been having an affair with Nehat. Nain distrusts Saira and kicks her out. That leads to a big drama with the drop scene of Nehat being a cripple in one leg and his divorce from Kiran. Nehat's parents move to Islamabad due to his father's new job but Nehat did not want to go leaving Saira so decides to stay behind. Nain and Saira patch up their differences and are happy in their lives with a child one year later. The scene also shows Nehat on the Wheel Chair saying 'Saira'.

Cast
 Zahid Ahmed as Squadron Leader Zulqarnain a.k.a. Nain
 Sanam Jung as Saira Waleed/Saira Zulqarnain 
 Affan Waheed as Nehad Farrukh
 Komal Aziz Khan as Kiran Waleed
 Waseem Abbas as Waleed
 Beena Chaudhary as Asma
 Huma Nawab as Farah
 Sangeeta as Amma
 Seemi Pasha as Sabra
 Ayesha Gul as Tehmina
 Imam Syed as Asghar
 Hashim Butt as Farrukh

Reception 
The show was earlier liked by the viewers as it marked the return of Sanam Jung on small screen after a long time. It gained 6.7 TRPs at its highest. Later, it was criticized due to its huge complex storyline and unnecessarily dragging.

References

Hum TV
Hum TV original programming
Pakistani romantic drama television series
2019 Pakistani television series debuts
Urdu-language television shows